Arti Rana (born ) is an Indian social entrepreneur. She helps fellow Tharu women to set up groups to make and sell handicrafts. In 2022, she received the Nari Shakti Puraskar, the highest civilian award for women in India.

Career 
Arti Rana was born around 1976. She is Tharu and lives in the Terai, near the Dudhwa Tiger Reserve and the border with Nepal. Under the National Rural Livelihood Mission, she set up Gautam self-employment to make items such as carpets, baskets and bags. The group worked with materials like moonj grass and jute.

By 2016, Rana had trained around 800 Tharu women. The business expanded, and by 2022 she was employing hundreds of women to make handicrafts. Rana was the president of the self-help group Tharu Hath KargaGharelu Udyog, which received assistance from the World Wide Fund for Nature to make its looms more efficient. In 2019, it was announced that a visitors centre would be built at the Dudhwa Tiger Reserve to inform tourists about Tharu heritage and sell local products; Rana was one of the co-ordinators for the project.

Awards and recognition 
Rana's entrepreneurship was recognized with a Rani Laxmibai Bravery award in 2016 and a Gram Swaraj award.

On International Women's Day in 2022, Rana received the Nari Shakti Puraskar, the highest award for women in India, for the year 2020 in recognition of her social entrepreneurship. The ceremony had been postponed due to the COVID-19 pandemic in India.

References 

Nari Shakti Puraskar winners
Indian social entrepreneurs
Indian weavers
21st-century Indian businesswomen
21st-century Indian businesspeople
1970s births
Living people